Trigonospermum is a genus of Mesoamerican plants in the family Asteraceae.

 Species
 Trigonospermum adenostemmoides Less. - Chiapas, Veracruz
 Trigonospermum annuum McVaugh & Lask. - Jalisco
 Trigonospermum auriculatum B.L.Turner - Guerrero
 Trigonospermum hintoniorum B.L.Turner - Tamaulipas, Nuevo León
 Trigonospermum melampodioides DC. - Oaxaca, Chiapas, Michoacán, Jalisco, Guerrero, Sinaloa, Morelos, Nayarit
 Trigonospermum stevensii S.D.Sundb. & Stuessy -  Nicaragua, Guatemala

 formerly included
see Sigesbeckia 
 Trigonospermum blakei - Sigesbeckia blakei

References

Asteraceae genera
Millerieae
Flora of Mexico
Flora of Central America